Kaarle Edvard Jansson (10 September 1888 – 18 February 1929) was a Finnish gymnast. He competed in the men's artistic individual all-around event at the 1912 Summer Olympics.

References

External links
 

1888 births
1929 deaths
Finnish male artistic gymnasts
Olympic gymnasts of Finland
Gymnasts at the 1912 Summer Olympics
People from Lohja
Sportspeople from Uusimaa